The Mitta United Football Netball Club, nicknamed the Mountain Men or the Blues, is an Australian rules football and netball club playing in the Tallangatta & District Football League. The club is based in Mitta Mitta, Victoria and Eskdale, Victoria. The club is a merger of Mitta Town and Eskdale football teams.

History 
Mitta Mitta F.C.
1883–1906: – local games
1907: Mitta Mitta Football League
1908: Tallangatta & District Football League
1909–1923: Club in Recess
1924–1926: Mitta Mitta Football League
1927–1931: Club in Recess
1932: Yackandandah Football League
1933: Tallangatta Football League
1934–1935: Club in Recess
1936: Chiltern & District Football Association
1937–1944: Club in Recess 
Eskdale F.C.
1907: Mitta Mitta Football League
1908: Tallangatta & District Football League
1935–1939: Dederang District Football League
1945–1946: Tallangatta & District Football Leagueas Eskdale-Mitta
1947–1950: Tallangatta & District Football Leagueas Mitta Valley
1951: Tallangatta & District Football Leagueas Eskdale

Premierships
Tallangatta & District Football League
1952,1953,1959,1960,1961,1963,1967,1968,1973,1975,1978,
1982,1986,1988,1992,1993,1996,2004,2005,2006,2007,2012
22: 
 Have won 5 grand finals by 1 point
First club in TDFL to win four consecutive Grand Finals, 2004, 2005, 2006, 2007

External links
 
 Gameday website

Australian rules football clubs in Victoria (Australia)